Laughter & Lust is the 11th studio album by Joe Jackson, released in 1991. A year before, he left A&M Records, which soon released Steppin' Out: The Very Best of Joe Jackson, which became a Top Ten hit in the UK. Jackson subsequently signed a recording contract with Virgin Records.

Music journalist Martin C. Strong states "Laughter & Lust was Jackson's most direct, accessible material in years, a welcome diversion from his constant experimentation".

Background
The recording of Laughter & Lust was preceded by a five-week "workshop tour" in the US during September and October 1990. The tour, which was billed as "Joe Jackson's Workshop", included performances of songs to be recorded for the album as a way of testing the new material before an audience. Laughter & Lust was then recorded over the course of October and November 1990 at Dreamland Recording Studios in Hurley, New York. It was mixed at Electric Lady Studios in November and December 1990.

Laughter & Lust was Jackson's first album for Virgin, following his departure from A&M in 1990. Jackson and his band embarked on a world tour to promote the album, which began on 18 May 1991 in Münster, Germany, and ended on 21 September 1991 in Sydney, Australia. The latter show was filmed and released in 1992 as Laughter & Lust Live.

Jackson told the Sandwell Evening Mail in 1991, "It's an album of light and shadows. Most of the songs are about sex and other romantic entanglements. We've put a lot of thought and feeling into the new songs." He added to the Evening Standard, "It's about one-third autobiographical, I suppose. You have to put yourself, your own experience into it or it isn't convincing."

Laughter & Lust would be Jackson's last non-classical studio album until 2000's Night and Day II. Jackson recalled in 2003, "After the Laughter & Lust world tour, it all turned to shit, basically. I had real bad writer's block. I couldn't even listen to music. I just lost it, totally. It was awful." In a 1994 interview with Cash Box, Jackson said, "Laughter & Lust, I felt, was the closest thing I could possibly do to a commercial pop record that I thought everyone was gonna love. And it was not very successful in the States. It did okay in Europe, actually. So it wasn't a complete flop."

Critical reception
On its release, Stephen Dalton of New Musical Express was negative in his review, commenting that Jackson is "not even interestingly bitter" and adding that he "present[s] these mundane mid-life moans as half-hearted social commentary that makes Phil Collins sound like Public Enemy."

Track listing
All songs written and arranged by Joe Jackson, except where noted.

Personnel 
 Musicians
 Joe Jackson – keyboards, vocals
 Graham Maby – bass, vocals
 Joy Askew – keyboards, vocals
 Tom Teeley – guitar, vocals
 Sue Hadjopoulos – percussion, drums
 Dan Hickey – drums
with:
 Michael Morreale – trumpet
 Tony Aiello – saxophones
 Annie Whitehead – trombone
 Charles McCracken – cello

 Production
 Joe Jackson – arrangements, producer
 Ed Roynesdal – co-producer, sampling, Kurzweil K250 sequencer
 Larry Alexander – recording engineer
 Dave Cook, John Yates – assistant recording engineer
 Adam Yellin – mixing engineer
 Melanie Nissen – art direction
 Patrik Andersson – photography

Charts

References

External links 
 Laughter & Lust album information at The Joe Jackson Archive

1991 albums
Joe Jackson (musician) albums
Virgin Records albums